Raidel Martínez Perez (born October 11, 1996) is a Cuban professional baseball pitcher for the Chunichi Dragons of Nippon Professional Baseball (NPB).

Professional career
On February 26, 2017, Martínez signed with the Chunichi Dragons of Nippon Professional Baseball. After spending the 2017 season with the club's farm team, Martínez recorded his first NPB victory on May 15, 2018, in a win over the Hiroshima Toyo Carp. However, he struggled to a 6.65 ERA in 7 games. In 2019, Martínez recorded a stellar 2.66 ERA with 48 strikeouts in 43 appearances. In 2020, he pitched to a neat 1.13 ERA in 40.0 innings across 40 appearances. 
On May 27, 2022, He made his first NPB All-Star appearance at Matsuyama Central Park Baseball Stadium. He took the mound in the eighth inning and allowed one hit but kept one scoreless inning.

International career
Martínez previously pitched for Vegueros de Pinar del Rio in the Cuban National Series. Martinez played for the Cuba national baseball team at 2017 World Baseball Classic.

References

External links

, NPB

1996 births
Living people
Baseball players at the 2019 Pan American Games
Chunichi Dragons players
Cuban expatriate baseball players in Japan
Nippon Professional Baseball pitchers
Pan American Games competitors for Cuba
People from Pinar del Río
Tigres de Ciego de Avila players
Vegueros de Pinar del Rio players
2017 World Baseball Classic players
2023 World Baseball Classic players